Godslayer is a fantasy novel by Jacqueline Carey. It continues the epic tragedy of The Sundering, begun in Banewreaker.

External links
 

2006 American novels
American fantasy novels
Tor Books books